Hellaween: Pure Horror is the second mixtape presented by Esham A. Smith. Released on October 13, 2009, it is a concept album inspired by multiple horror films and the radio drama format of programs such as The War of the Worlds.

Track listing

References

2009 mixtape albums
Albums produced by Esham
Concept albums
Reel Life Productions compilation albums